Khandallah is a suburb of Wellington, the capital city of New Zealand.

Description
The northeastern part of the suburb is dominated by a large area of parkland, which stretches north towards Johnsonville. Three parks that make up this reserve land total almost  of the slopes of Mount Kaukau. The summit of this  peak, which is topped by Wellington's main television transmitter tower, provides impressive views of the harbour. Khandallah has a reputation for being one of the most affluent of Wellington's suburbs.

The Khandallah village shopping centre in Ganges Road has a supermarket, restaurant, dairy  and a pub as well as the Library and Town Hall. Here nineteen new shops opened in the 1920s, overtaking the original shops around the railway station. 
 
Box Hill was named after a sentry post that was established during the "Māori Scare" of 1846, near the present Anglican Church; see Old Porirua Road.

Demography

Khandallah had a population of 8,583 at the 2018 New Zealand census, an increase of 369 people (4.5%) since the 2013 census, and an increase of 732 people (9.3%) since the 2006 census. There were 3,099 households. There were 4,092 males and 4,482 females, giving a sex ratio of 0.91 males per female, with 1,755 people (20.4%) aged under 15 years, 1,377 (16.0%) aged 15 to 29, 4,278 (49.8%) aged 30 to 64, and 1,170 (13.6%) aged 65 or older.

Ethnicities were 84.3% European/Pākehā, 5.9% Māori, 2.1% Pacific peoples, 12.7% Asian, and 3.4% other ethnicities (totals add to more than 100% since people could identify with multiple ethnicities).

The proportion of people born overseas was 30.4%, compared with 27.1% nationally.

Although some people objected to giving their religion, 53.7% had no religion, 35.5% were Christian, 1.5% were Hindu, 1.0% were Muslim, 0.8% were Buddhist and 2.2% had other religions.

Of those at least 15 years old, 3,708 (54.3%) people had a bachelor or higher degree, and 333 (4.9%) people had no formal qualifications. The employment status of those at least 15 was that 3,906 (57.2%) people were employed full-time, 1,026 (15.0%) were part-time, and 189 (2.8%) were unemployed.

Facilities

Library
Khandallah Library was opened in 1953 in the middle of Khandallah village on Ganges Road, after a 1947 petition by local writer Fanny Irvine-Smith. The library serves an average of 1600 customers a week.  The Greater Wellington Regional Council local rain gauge is located here.

Town Hall
The Khandallah Town Hall has a capacity of over 350 people, including 140 seats and 20 tables and has a stage, kitchen and gallery. It was built in 1912 as the Khandallah Public Hall.

Recreation centre and park
Nairnville Recreation Centre features a multi-purpose sports hall suitable for basketball, netball, volleyball, and badminton. A squash court is available for hire and an upstairs community room with kitchen facilities.

Nairnville Park features sports fields that are used for football, rugby and cricket. An artificial turf was added in March 2009. The park also includes a children's playground, cricket training nets and a skateboard half pipe.

Nairnville Park and Recreation Centre are named after James and Louisa Nairn who owned farm land in the area.

Swimming pool
Khandallah summer pool is a 30-metre unheated outdoor summer pool at the end of Woodmancote Road.

Transport
The suburb is served by the Johnsonville Branch commuter railway which connects it to the central city and surrounding suburbs. It has three railway stations; Khandallah, Box Hill and Simla Crescent. Parts of the suburb nearer the harbour and some distance from the stations are served by several Metlink bus routes.

Education

School enrolment zones
Khandallah is within the enrolment zones for Wellington Girls' College, Onslow College, Raroa Normal Intermediate and St Oran's College.

Primary schools

Khandallah has three primary schools.

The school is on Clark St and the site was first occupied by a school in January 1893.

The school is on Nicholson Road and was opened in 1952 by Archbishop Peter Cardinal McKeefry. The school was integrated with the state school system in 1981.

History 
Khandallah is named after Khandela, Rajasthan, or may be Khandala and supposedly means "Resting place of God" in an unspecified language. It is noteworthy that KhānAllāh means the hostel of God in Arabic. Hence the suburb and those surrounding it have many place names connected with the Indian subcontinent; e.g. Calcutta Street and Simla Crescent.

The name may have come from a homestead built in the area in 1884 by Captain James Andrew, who had recently returned from duty in India and had been consul in Baghdad.   When the railway was laid through the area by the Wellington and Manawatu Railway Company, Andrew is reported as insisting that the railway station be named Khandallah with the h on the end of the name, and reportedly gave land for the Khandallah station provided all trains stop there.

However, Edward Battersbee (also spelt Battersby) was listed in the 1864-1865 Province of Wellington electoral roll as living at Khandallah, Porirua Road on 23 April 1864 some 20 years earlier than Andrew. In addition Battersby had worked for the East India Company as a veterinary surgeon in the Bombay Light Cavalry, thereby making him the more likely originator of the suburb's name. In January 1868 Battersbee placed his 450-acre property, named in the advertisement as Khrandalah, on the market for sale.

Another settler from the British Indian Army was Captain Charles Sharp of the Bombay Native Infantry who lived elsewhere but bought land around the Khandallah railway station and let it to sheep farmer Captain John Kirwan. In 1894 Robert Hanna bought it for subdivision.

When the formation of the Borough of Onslow was proposed in 1889, Khandallah was already described as a District, and was a part of the Onslow Borough until it merged with Wellington in 1919.

Khandallah was largely farmland to the 1920s; James Nairn built a farmhouse in 1869 on the old Ngatoto Native Reserve, now Nairnville Park. The opening of the railway to Wellington in 1886 (now the Johnsonville Branch) enabled people to commute into Wellington, and the line was electrified with more frequent and faster trains in 1938. The population of Khandallah increased from 766 in 1916 to 2,498 in 1938.

Access was originally via the Old Porirua Road until new access roads opened; Onslow Road down to the Hutt Road in the 1920s and Burma Road to Johnsonville (superseding Fraser Avenue) in 1936.

Notable people
Jessica Hammond, New Zealand politician

Further reading

References

External links
Wellington City Libraries' Khandallah page
Khandallah in the Cyclopaedia of New Zealand, 1897 

 
 

Suburbs of Wellington City
Populated places around the Wellington Harbour